The Pacific Daily News, formerly Guam Daily News, is a morning edition newspaper based in Hagåtña, in the United States territory of Guam. It is owned by Kaleo Moylan and is published seven days a week.

History
Guam Daily News began as a newspaper of the United States Navy, published under various titles. Joseph Flores, later the Governor of Guam, bought the newspaper in 1950.

In 1970, a group of purchasers headed by the Honolulu Star-Bulletin acquired the Guam Daily News for an undisclosed price. The paper was renamed the Pacific Daily News the same year. The Pacific Daily News was acquired by the Gannett Company in 1971, along with several other newspapers owned by the Star-Bulletin.

In February 2021, former lieutenant governor, senator, and local businessman Kaleo Moylan purchased the Pacific Daily News from subsidiaries of the Gannett Company. Moylan's acquisition of the Pacific Daily News returned the media company to local ownership after 50 years of ownership by Gannett.

Contents
The Pacific Daily News ("PDN" as nicknamed by locals) offers readers the latest local headlines and stories covering Guam, Micronesia and the Pacific Rim region, along with breaking news from the United States and the world. Most of what the PDN covers usually involves political matters and issues affecting those living on Guam.

In addition, the PDN also features a weekly entertainment section published each Friday called "GuamPika", which is geared towards visitors to the island.

It is one of two newspapers on Guam, the other being The Guam Daily Post. The Marianas Variety, out of Saipan, offers competition in the Commonwealth of the Northern Mariana Islands.

Sister publications
The PDN publishes these spinoff weeklies, geared towards military personnel:
The Navigator – Which focuses on the Naval community
The Pacific Edge – Serving the Air Force community

References

External links

1951 establishments in Guam
Gannett publications
Newspapers published in Guam
Publications established in 1951